The Forks of Cypress was a large slave-labour cotton farm and Greek Revival plantation house near Florence in Lauderdale County, Alabama. It was designed by architect William Nichols for James Jackson and his wife, Sally Moore Jackson.  Construction was completed in 1830. It was the only Greek Revival house in Alabama with a two-story colonnade around the entire house, composed of 24 Ionic columns.  The name was derived from the fact that Big Cypress Creek and Little Cypress Creek border the plantation and converge near the site of the main house.  Although the main house was destroyed by fire in 1966 after being struck by lightning, the site was placed on the Alabama Register of Landmarks and Heritage on April 14, 1992 and the National Register of Historic Places on October 10, 1997. The site is the property of the State of Alabama; a local board has oversight.

History
James Jackson was born October 25, 1782, in Ballybay, County Monaghan, Ireland. Jackson moved to Alabama from Nashville, Tennessee, in 1818.  From 1822 on, he was active in state politics and  served in both houses of the Alabama Legislature. In 1830, Jackson was named president of the Alabama Senate.

In the 1820s and 30s, James Jackson, an avid horseman, imported a dozen or more English thoroughbreds for breeding his own horses and in an effort to improve the overall bloodstock of the American thoroughbred.  He was eminently successful in the effort, particularly with three of his imports: Leviathan in 1830, Gallopade in 1835 and Glencoe in 1836.  American turf historian John Hervey rates James Jackson as "the most successful importer in the history of the American thoroughbred". James Jackson died on August 17, 1840, and was buried in the family cemetery, near the plantation house.  His widow was the executor of his will and, on October 9, 1840, made bond in the amount of $400,000.  The will of James Jackson, recorded September 15, 1840, at the Lauderdale County Court House, directed his nephew Thomas Kirkman to manage a trust which would control and gradually sell off the racehorses, a duty Kirkman completed in 1848, with the sale of Glencoe.

During the American Civil War invading Union forces used the lands of the Forks as a base camp. At this time, the farm was owned by James' widow, Sarah Jackson. Additionally, some of writer Alex Haley's ancestors were slaves on this plantation, which provides a setting for much of his book, Queen: The Story of an American Family.  Hugh Scott owned The Forks of Cypress in 1935 and by the 1940s sold the plantation to Rufus B. Dowdy (1897-1980), who restored the house and grounds.  On June 6, 1966, the plantation house was struck by lightning and burned to the ground. It was never rebuilt, but the Dowdy family carefully preserved the brick pillars, still standing in picturesque ruin, as well as the original log house, several outbuildings and the Jackson family cemetery. As of June 2017, twenty-three of the original twenty-four brick pillars remain standing.

The replica serves as a Regions Bank branch.

In addition to the Regions Bank replica, another replica of The Forks of Cypress was built in 2005.  It is located near the Historic Natchez Trace Parkway in western Lauderdale County, Alabama approximately 16 miles west of Florence. This building is a private residence and it is not open to the public.

References

External links
 

National Register of Historic Places in Lauderdale County, Alabama
Greek Revival houses in Alabama
Plantation houses in Alabama
Former buildings and structures in Alabama
Houses completed in 1830
William Nichols buildings
Properties on the Alabama Register of Landmarks and Heritage
1830 establishments in Alabama
Historic American Buildings Survey in Alabama
Cotton plantations in the United States
Plantations in Alabama
Burned houses in the United States
Buildings and structures demolished in 1966
1966 disestablishments in Alabama